East Valley High School (EVHS) is a public high school located at 5525 Vineland Avenue in the North Hollywood area of Los Angeles, California, United States. It is a part of the Los Angeles Unified School District. East Valley High School shares the same campus with The Science Academy STEM Magnet.

References

External links
 East Valley High School

Educational institutions established in 2006
Los Angeles Unified School District schools
High schools in the San Fernando Valley
High schools in Los Angeles
Public high schools in California
North Hollywood, Los Angeles
2006 establishments in California